The 2023 Nigerian Senate elections in Jigawa State will be held on 25 February 2023, to elect the 3 federal Senators from Jigawa State, one from each of the state's three senatorial districts. The elections will coincide with the 2023 presidential election, as well as other elections to the Senate and elections to the House of Representatives; with state elections being held two weeks later. Primaries were held between 4 April and 9 June 2022.

Background
In the previous Senate elections, only one incumbent senator was returned: Mohammed Sabo Nakudu (APC-South-West) was re-elected but Abdullahi Abubakar Gumel (APC-North-West) lost renomination and Muhammad Ubali Shittu (PDP-North-East) lost re-election. In the South-West district, Nakudu held his seat with 60% of the vote; both of the open seats were also won by the APC as Danladi Abdullahi Sankara won the North-West district with 65% and Ibrahim Hassan Hadejia gained the North-East seat with 61% of the vote. These results were a part of a continuation of the Jigawa APC's control as every House of Representatives seat was won by the party, it won a majority in the state House of Assembly, and Buhari won the state in the presidential election by a wide margin.

Overview

Summary

Jigawa North-East 

The Jigawa North-East Senatorial District covers the local government areas of Auyo, Biriniwa, Guri, Hadejia, Kafin Hausa, Kaugama, Kiri Kasama, and Malam Madori. The incumbent Ibrahim Hassan Hadejia (APC) was elected with 60.8% of the vote in 2019. Hassan Hadejia ran for governor of Jigawa State instead of seeking re-election; he was defeated in the APC gubernatorial primary.

Primary elections

All Progressives Congress 

On the primary date, three candidates contested an indirect primary that ended with former minister Ahmad Abdulhamid Malam Madori winning the nomination after results showed him defeating Ubale Hashim Yusufu by a significant margin.

People's Democratic Party 

Like other Jigawa PDP senatorial primaries, there was not a contest for the northeastern nomination as former MHR Hussaini Namadi was unopposed for the nomination; however, Namadi later withdrew from the nomination. On 10 July, Nuruddeen Muhammad—former Minister of State for Foreign Affairs—was nominated unopposed at the rerun primary in Hadejia. Muhammad thanked delegates and lamented desertification, perennial floods, and the high prevalence of kidney diseases in local areas as the issues facing the district.

General election

Results

Jigawa North-West 

The Jigawa North-West Senatorial District covers the local government areas of Babura, Garki, Gagarawa, Gumel, Gwiwa, Kazaure, Maigatari, Ringim, Ron, Sule Tankarkar, Taura, and Yankwashi. The incumbent Danladi Abdullahi Sankara (APC) was re-elected with 65.2% of the vote in 2019. Sankara initially sought renomination but withdrew from the primary.

Primary elections

All Progressives Congress 

Before the primary, Sankara announced his withdrawal in protest of the alleged bias towards other candidates due to their support from Governor Mohammed Badaru Abubakar. In the primary, Babangida Hussaini—former Permanent Secretary of the Federal Ministry of Works and Housing—was nominated in a landslide over former Senator Abdullahi Abubakar Gumel.

People's Democratic Party 

A few days prior to the primary, former Governor Ibrahim Saminu Turaki returned to the PDP and immediately declared his senatorial candidacy leading the only other candidate—former commissioner Nasiru Umar Roni—to withdraw in favour of him. This move led to an uncontested primary in Gumel that nominated Turaki.

General election

Results

Jigawa South-West 

The Jigawa South-West Senatorial District covers the local government areas of Birnin Kudu, Buji, Dutse, Gwaram, Jahun, Kiyawa, and Miga. Incumbent Mohammed Sabo Nakudu (APC) was re-elected with 60.1% of the vote in 2019. Nakudu ran for governor of Jigawa State instead of seeking re-election; he was defeated in the APC gubernatorial primary. However, after the death of the APC senatorial nominee, Nakudu was renominated and is seeking re-election.

Primary elections

All Progressives Congress 

In the original primary, former MHR Tijjani Ibrahim Gaya was nominated unopposed. However, Ibrahim Gaya died in August 2022. In the new primary later that month, Nakudu was nominated unopposed at the venue in Dutse; he thanked Governor Mohammed Badaru Abubakar after the primary.

People's Democratic Party 

Like other Jigawa PDP senatorial primaries, there was not a contest for the northwestern nomination as Mustapha Khabeeb—House of Representatives member for Miga/Jahun—was nominated unopposed at the primary in Dutse.

General election

Results

Notes

See also 
 2023 Nigerian Senate election
 2023 Nigerian elections

References 

Jigawa State senatorial elections
2023 Jigawa State elections
Jigawa State Senate elections